Cuerdley is a civil parish in the Borough of Warrington, Cheshire, England. It has a population of 107 (2001 census) and much of its area is farmland. A large part of Cuerdley is occupied by the Fiddlers Ferry Power Station.

References

References

Warrington
Civil parishes in Warrington